Claudia Acuña (July 31, 1971, Santiago) is a Chilean jazz vocalist, songwriter, and arranger.

Biography
Born July 3 1971 in Santiago and raised in Concepcion, she was inspired as a child to perform a variety of music, including folk, pop and opera, by Victor Jara and Violeta Parra. Her attention turned to American popular music and jazz at the age of 15, when she first heard Frank Sinatra, Erroll Garner and Sarah Vaughan. Returning to Santiago in 1991, she quickly gained prominence on the local jazz scene through live performances and radio broadcasts with visiting artists.

In 1995, Acuña moved to New York City and began performing at jam sessions and clubs including the Zinc Bar and Smalls. She also performed with her own band at the famous Jazz Gallery. Among the many musical associates she met in this period was pianist/composer Jason Lindner, who became and has remained her musical director.

Her debut album, Wind from the South, was released in 1999 on Verve Records, followed by Rhythm of Life in 2001 and Luna in 2004. Acuña's first recording on the Marsalis Music label, En Este Momento, was released in 2009. She has also been featured on various recordings with Peck Almond, George Benson, Joey Calderazzo, Avishai Cohen, Mark Elf, Tom Harrell, Antonio Hart, Arturo O'Farrill and Guillermo Klein.

Acuña has been named co-curator of a Chilean music festival that took place in January 2009. She is also the spokesperson for World Vision Chile, an international Christian relief and development organization that specializes in child-focused development programs. One of Acuña's covers of the Antonio Carlos Jobim song "Suddenly" was featured on the original motion picture soundtrack from Verve Records for the movie Bossa Nova. In 2001 she recorded a single with House producers MKL and Soy Sos of 3 Generations Walking called "Slavery Days" which gained her substantial exposure outside of the jazz medium. Claudia is signed to the Cambridge, Massachusetts-based record label, Marsalis Music.

Discography

As leader
 Wind from the South (Verve, 2000)
 Rhythm of Life (Verve, 2002)
 Luna (Maxjazz, 2004)
 En Este Momento (Marsalis Music, 2009)
 Kalimba Collage with Kenny Wollesen (Soniculture, 2009)
 Turning Pages (Plaza, 2019)

As guest
 George Benson, Absolute Benson (Verve, 2000)
 Danilo Pérez, Motherland (Verve, 2000)
 Joey Calderazzo, Amanecer (Marsalis Music, 2007)
 Avishai Cohen, Adama (Stretch, 1998)
 Avishai Cohen, Colors (Stretch, 2000)
 Billy Childs, Rebirth (Mack Avenue, 2017)
 David Gilmore, Unified Presence (RKM Music, 2006)
 David Gilmore, Numerology:Live at Jazz Standard (Evolutionary Music, 2012)
 Tom Harrell, Wise Children (Bluebird/Arista, 2003)
 Susie Ibarra, Perception (Decibel Collective, 2018)
 Willie Jones III, The Next Phase (WJ3, 2010)
 Guillermo Klein, Los Guachos II (Sunnyside, 1999)
 Jason Lindner, Gives You Now vs Now (Anzic, 2009)
 Fabrizio Sotti, Right Now (Red River Entertainment, 2013)
 Louie Vega, Elements of Life (Cutting Edge, 2003)

References

External links
 "In Conversation with Claudia Acuña" by Tomas Peña (Jazz.com)
 Studio Session on NPR Music
 Images of Claudia Acuna, digitized photographs from the James Arkatov Collection held at UCLA Library Special Collections.

1971 births
Living people
Bossa nova singers
Chilean Christians
Chilean jazz singers
Latin jazz singers
20th-century Chilean women singers
21st-century Chilean women singers
Women in Latin music